The men's compound archery competition at the 2005 World Games took place from 15 to 17 August 2005 at the Mülheimer Wald und MüGa-Gelände in Duisburg, Germany.

Competition format
A total of 28 archers entered the competition. The best four athletes from preliminary round qualifies to the semifinals.

Results

Preliminary round

Finals

References

External links
 Results on IWGA website

Field archery at the 2005 World Games